Computerworld (abbreviated as CW) is an ongoing decades-old professional publication which in 2014 "went digital." Its audience is information technology (IT) and business technology professionals, and is available via a publication website and as a digital magazine.

As a printed weekly during the 1970s and into the 1980s, Computerworld was the leading trade publication in the data processing industry.  Indeed, based on circulation and revenue it was one of the most successful trade publications in any industry.  Later in the 1980s it began to lose its dominant position.

It is published in many countries around the world under the same or similar names. Each country's version of Computerworld includes original content and is managed independently. The parent company of Computerworld US is IDG Communications.

History
The first issue was published in 1967.

Going international
The company IDG offers the brand "Computerworld" in 47 countries worldwide, the name and frequency differ slightly though. When IDG established the Swedish edition in 1983 i.e., the title "Computerworld" was already registered in Sweden by another publisher. This is why the Swedish edition is named . The corresponding German publication is called  (which translates to "computer week") instead.

Computerworld was distributed as a morning newspaper in tabloid format (41 cm) in 51,000 copies (2007) with an estimated 120,000 readers. From 1999 to 2008, it was published three days a week, but since 2009, it was published only on Tuesdays and Fridays.

Going digital
In June 2014, Computerworld US abandoned its print edition, becoming an exclusively digital publication. In July 2014, the publisher started the monthly Computerworld Digital Magazine. In 2017 it published features and stories highlighting the magazine's history on the fiftieth anniversary.

Computerworlds website first appeared in 1996.

Ongoing
Computerworld US serves IT and business management with coverage of information technology, emerging technologies and analysis of technology trends. Computerworld also publishes several notable special reports each year, including the 100 Best Places to Work in IT, IT Salary Survey, the DATA+ Editors' Choice Awards and the annual Forecast research report. Computerworld in the past has published stories that highlight the effects of immigration to the U.S. (e.g. the H-1B visa) on software engineers.

Staff

The executive editor of Computerworld in the U.S. is Ken Mingis, who leads a small staff of editors, writers and freelancers who cover a variety of enterprise IT topics (with a concentration on Windows, Mobile and Apple/Enterprise).

See also
Patrick Joseph McGovern

References

Further reading

External links
 
 

1967 establishments in the United States
1983 establishments in Norway
1983 establishments in Sweden
Defunct computer magazines published in the United States
International Data Group
Magazines established in 1967
Magazines disestablished in 2014
Magazines published in Boston
Monthly magazines published in the United States
Online magazines published in the United States
Online magazines with defunct print editions